Cléopatre Darleux (born 1 July 1989) is a French handball goalkeeper for Brest Bretagne Handball and the French national team.

She participated at the 2009 World Women's Handball Championship in China, winning a silver medal with the French team.

Darleux competed for France at the 2012 Summer Olympics and at the 2020 Summer Olympics (played in 2021 in Japan), where she helped the team win the gold medal.

Achievements

Club 
International 

 EHF Champions League
 Finalist: 2021 (with Brest Bretagne Handball)

 EHF Cup Winners' Cup
 Winner: 2014 (with Viborg HK)

Domestic 

 French league:
 Winner: 2011 (with Metz Handball), 2012 (with Arvor 29) and 2021 (with Brest Bretagne Handball)
 Runner up: 2017, 2018 and 2022 (with Brest Bretagne Handball)
 Tied 1st: 2020 (with Brest Bretagne Handball)

 French Cup (Coupe de France):
 Winner: 2010 (with Metz Handball), 2018 and 2021 (with Brest Bretagne Handball)

 French Women's League Cup Championship (Coupe de la Ligue):
 Winner: 2010 and 2011 (with Metz Handball), 2012 (with Arvor 29) 
 Runner up: 2016 (with OGC Nice) 
 Danish league (Damehåndboldligaen):
 Winner: 2014 (with Viborg HK)
 Danish Cup:
 Winner: 2013 (with Viborg HK)

National team 

 Olympic Games
 2012: 5th
 2020: 

 World Championship:
 2009: 
 2011: 
 2013: 6th
 2017: 
 2021: 

 European Championship
 2008: 14th
 2010: 5th
 2012: 9th
 2020: 
 2022: 4th
 Other senior competitions
  at the Mediterranean Games in 2009
 Junior competitions
  at the European Women's U-17 Handball Championship in 2005
 4th at the IHF Women's Youth World Championship (U18) in 2006
 5th at the European Women's U-19 Handball Championship in 2007
 7th at the IHF Women's Junior World Championship (U20) in 2008

Individual awards

 French Championship
 MVP / Best player: 2018
 Best Goalkeeper (2): 2012 and 2018
 Player of the month (6): March 2016, October 2016, April 2017, March 2018, September 2018, January 2022
 European Championship
 Best Goalkeeper: 2022
 Other:
 2nd biggest champion of the year selected by L'Équipe in 2021

Honors 

 Inducted into the Legion of Honor with the rank of Chevalier: 2021

References

External links

1989 births
Living people
French female handball players
Handball players at the 2012 Summer Olympics
Viborg HK players
Olympic handball players of France
Sportspeople from Mulhouse
Expatriate handball players
French expatriate sportspeople in Denmark
Handball players at the 2020 Summer Olympics
Medalists at the 2020 Summer Olympics
Olympic medalists in handball
Olympic gold medalists for France
Mediterranean Games medalists in handball
Mediterranean Games gold medalists for France
Competitors at the 2009 Mediterranean Games